Calisto nubila is a butterfly of the family Nymphalidae. It is endemic to Puerto Rico.

The larvae feed on various grasses.

References

Butterflies described in 1899
Calisto (butterfly)
Butterflies of the Caribbean